Henry Davison may refer to:

 Henry Pomeroy Davison, American banker and philanthropist
 Henry Davison (judge), British India judge

See also
 Henry Davidson (disambiguation)